John Peoples may refer to:
 John Peoples (educator), president of Jackson State University
 John Peoples Jr. American physicist